Di Menna is an Italian patronymic from the name Menna, which itself comes from the Greek Mēnas. It is sometimes spelled DiMenna, Dimenna, and di Menna.
 
Notable people with the surname Di Menna include:

 Grey J. Dimenna, the ninth president of Monmouth University
 Joseph DiMenna, American hedge fund manager
 Margaret di Menna, (1923–2014), New Zealand microbiologist
 Michele Di Menna (born 1980), Canadian interdisciplinary artist
 Ron DiMenna, founder of Ron Jon Surf Shop

References

See also 

 DiMenna Center for Classical Music
 DiMenna–Nyselius Library

Patronymic surnames
Surnames of Italian origin